The 1781 Vermont Republic gubernatorial election took place throughout September, and resulted in the re-election of Thomas Chittenden to a one-year term.

The Vermont General Assembly met in Charlestown, New Hampshire on October 12. The meeting site was chosen as part of a short-lived effort to create a union of Vermont with 17 Connecticut River Valley towns of New Hampshire.

The Vermont House of Representatives appointed a committee to examine the votes of the freemen of Vermont for governor, lieutenant governor, treasurer, and governor's council members. Thomas Chittenden was re-elected governor. The popular vote indicated that no candidate for lieutenant governor had received a majority. In keeping with the Vermont Constitution, the choice fell to the Vermont General Assembly, which chose Elisha Payne, a New Hampshire resident who supported the union of New Hampshire's western towns with Vermont. Ira Allen was re-elected as treasurer. The names of candidates and balloting totals were not recorded.

Results

References

Vermont gubernatorial elections
1781 in Vermont
1781 elections in North America